Diego Berdakin  is a Los Angeles-based Internet entrepreneur and University of Southern California professor. He founded the social commerce company BeachMint along with Myspace co-founder Josh Berman, which later was acquired by Condé Nast to form The Lucky Group. Berdakin is also a notable investor in several technology companies.

Early life and education
Berdakin was born and raised in Los Angeles by his Argentinian parents. At the age of thirteen, he enrolled in a C/C++ programming class at University of California, Los Angeles (UCLA). He graduated from Northwestern University with a bachelors of science in political science.

Career
Berdakin began his post collegiate career at Slingshot Labs, the digital research and development arm of News Corp., as the Executive Vice President. In this role, Diego built standalone companies for Myspace, Fox and The Wall Street Journal.

In 2010, Berdakin and Josh Berman teamed up to create the social commerce company BeachMint. Based in Santa Monica, BeachMint attracted the fashion and design talents of celebrities such as Kate Bosworth, Rachel Bilson, the Mary-Kate and Ashley Olsen, Justin Timberlake and jeweler Philip Crangi. In 2014, Conde Nast acquired majority ownership of BeachMint and then merged with Lucky magazine to form The Lucky Group. He was a founding partner at FabFitFun, Re/Done, iEscrow, and Weaving Capital.

Berdakin has been an adjunct professor at the School of Cinematic Arts at the University of Southern California since 2012. In 2015, Berdakin was a finalist for the school’s Steven J. Sample Teaching Award. Berdakin also teaches classes at Marshall Business school and Virterbri School of Engineering at USC.

In 2016, Berdakin bought two warehouses and combined them to become the first warehouse kitchen for CloudKitchens (at the time called Urban Kitchen). In January 2019, Travis Kalanick (the former CEO of Uber) purchased a controlling interest in Berdakin's company for $150 million USD. In January 2021, CloudKitchens raised new funding at a $15 billion USD valuation.

Civic engagement
Berdakin is the main benefactor of USC School of Cinematic Art's Neighborhood Academic initiative supporting inner city students' creative development. Berdakin serves on the board of directors of The LAPD Foundation which provides critical resources and vital support to the Los Angeles Police Department. Berdakin is a founding member of Mayor's Fund for Los Angeles which is a non-profit organization dedicated to improving life for all Angelenos.

Investing activity
Diego Berdakin has been an investor in several notable internet companies.
Ring.Com
GoEuro
DropBox
Nest
FlipKart
HackerOne
Postmates

References

External links 

American technology executives
American business executives
Living people
Businesspeople from Los Angeles
Year of birth missing (living people)
American people of Argentine descent
University of California, Los Angeles alumni
Northwestern University alumni